Still Pimping is the fourth solo studio album by American rapper Pimp C. It was released through Rap-A-Lot Records and Universal Motown Records on July 12, 2011, making it his second posthumous solo release. The album features guest appearances from Bun B, Da Underdawgz, Paul Wall, Slim Thug, Smoke D, Big K.R.I.T., Brooke Valentine, C-Bo, Cory Mo, Hezeleo, Killa Kyleon, Lil' Keke, Too $hort and Vicious.

Track listing

Charts

References

2011 albums
Pimp C albums
Rap-A-Lot Records albums
Albums published posthumously
Albums produced by Mike Dean (record producer)